Alejandro "Alex" Dey (born June 26, 1958) is a Mexican American, life coach, motivational speaker, sales adviser and published writer. He is the author eight books, including La Biblia Del Vendedor.

Dey writes and talks about subjects such as self-improvement, life coaching and sales techniques. Dey began his motivational speaker career in 1985 at the age of 27 in Mexico City. In 2012, Dey received an honorary doctorate from the Instituto Americano Cultural in Mexico for his work.

Early life 
Dey was born José Alejandro Torresdey in Parral, Chihuahua, on June 26, 1958. He spent his first thirteen years of life in between the border of USA and Mexico (also known as the Borderland), while he was a shoe shiner, he was adopted by an American family which gave him work and shelter. At the age of 14 his adoptive family introduced him to motivational audio tapes by Earl Nightingale, and by the age of 18, Dey was already a fan. 

At the age of 19, Dey became successful in his sales career. At the age of 26 he opened a chain of restaurants in Texas generating his first million dollars.

Career 
After his success in sales and restaurants, Dey moved to Miami where he opened the Dey Research Institute which purpose is to study Hispanic behavior. Prepared with this information, Dey started giving seminars to insurance companies in Mexico City.

In 1987, he arrived in Mexico City where he began training groups of 20 or 30 people eventually up to 120; By the year 1995, Day spoke to audiences no smaller than 1000 people. Alex Dey gives the opening monologue in Ingles Sin Barreras.

Personal life 
Dey's son Bryan Torresdey is a professional stand-up comedian and screenwriter.

References

External links 
 

American motivational speakers
Motivational writers
1958 births
Living people
People from Parral, Chihuahua
Mexican emigrants to the United States
Motivational speakers